Peroxysulfuric acid can refer to either of these chemical compounds:

Peroxymonosulfuric acid, H2SO5
Peroxydisulfuric acid, H2S2O8